James E. Thomas is an American screenwriter based in California. With his brother John Thomas, he wrote and/or was substantially involved with the screenplays of several films - including Predator (1987) and Predator 2 (1990),  Executive Decision (1996), Wild Wild West (1999), Behind Enemy Lines (2001) and the TV series Hard Time on Planet Earth.

Early life

Born in Needles, California and raised in Bakersfield, Jim  worked as lifeguard, teacher, ditch digger and carpenter, attended law school and worked as a grip and soundman in low-budget features.

Writing
In 1983, he had the idea that would become Predator and asked his brother for help in developing a script. Thomas and his brother took inspiration from a joke circulating Hollywood concerning the Rocky franchise and its lead character, and wrote a screenplay based on it. It was originally titled Hunter. The script was picked up by 20th Century Fox in 1985, and turned over to producer Joel Silver who, based on his experience with Commando, decided to turn the science fiction pulp storyline into a big-budget film.

Thomas worked on a number of Hollywood productions through the 1980s, 1990s and 2000s, such as The Rescue (1988), Two-Fisted Tales (1992) and Mission to Mars (2000). Along with his brother, he created the short-lived TV series Hard Time on Planet Earth.

References

External links

Year of birth missing (living people)
Living people
20th-century American screenwriters
21st-century American screenwriters
American male screenwriters
People from Needles, California
Screenwriters from California
20th-century American male writers
21st-century American male writers